Karam Ali Nirlou (19 March 1943 – 1983) was an Iranian football midfielder who played for Iran in the 1964 Summer Olympics. He also played for Taj SC.

He played in two games for Iran in the 1964 Summer Olympics against Romania and Mexico and scored his only national goal against Mexico.

Record at Olympic Games

References

External links
 Sports-Reference profile
 
 FIFA.com

1943 births
1983 deaths
People from Tehran
Iran international footballers
Iranian footballers
Esteghlal F.C. players
Olympic footballers of Iran
Footballers at the 1964 Summer Olympics
Association football midfielders